Old Dan's Records is Canadian singer Gordon Lightfoot's ninth original album, released in 1972 on the Reprise Records label. The album reached #1 in Canada on the RPM national album chart on November 5, 1972, and remained there for three weeks. In the U.S., it peaked at #95 on the pop chart.

The album marks a continued evolution in Lightfoot's sound as he begins to add country influences to his standard folk sound with the help of the banjo, dobro and steel guitar. Lightfoot would continue to use these country influences in his music until the early 1980s.

Despite its 1972 year of initial release, the album was nominated for and won the 1974 Juno Award for "Folk Album of the Year".  Lightfoot also won a Juno that year as "Folk Singer of the Year".

Track listing

Side 1
 "Farewell to Annabel" – 2:59
 "That Same Old Obsession" – 3:46
 "Old Dan's Records" – 3:05
 "Lazy Mornin'" – 3:43
 "You Are What I Am" – 2:37

Side 2
 "Can't Depend on Love" – 3:12
 "My Pony Won't Go" – 3:50
 "It's Worth Believin'" – 3:24
 "Mother of a Miner's Child" – 3:18
 "Hi'way Songs" – 3:37

All compositions by Lightfoot

Personnel
 Gordon Lightfoot - vocals, guitar, vibraphone
 Rick Haynes - bass
 Terry Clements - lead guitar
 Red Shea - lead guitar, classical guitar, Dobro
 Barry Keane - drums, percussion
 Dave Brown - percussion
 Bruce Good - autoharp
 Larry Good - 5-string banjo
 David Bromberg - slide Dobro ("My Pony Won't Go")
 Nick De Caro - piano, orchestral arrangements
 Ollie Strong - steel guitar
Technical
Lee Herschberg - engineer
Ed Thrasher - art direction
John Reeves - photography
"Special thanks to Bill Richards and Guido Basso and members of the Toronto Symphony Orchestra"

References

External links
Album lyrics and chords

Gordon Lightfoot albums
1972 albums
Albums produced by Lenny Waronker
Reprise Records albums